Down II: A Bustle in Your Hedgerow is the second studio album by American band Down, released on March 26, 2002. The subtitle "A Bustle in Your Hedgerow" is borrowed from the lyrics of "Stairway to Heaven" by Led Zeppelin.

Background
Down II was the band's first album in seven years since the release of NOLA, the longest gap between their three studio albums to date. Being a supergroup, the band went on hiatus in 1996 so that members could focus on their main bands (namely Eyehategod, Corrosion of Conformity, Crowbar, and Pantera). Down reformed in 1999 with Pantera bassist Rex Brown replacing Todd Strange. The band wanted the album to have a "bluesy" feel, so they moved into Phil Anselmo's barn, dubbed "Nodferatu's Lair", in Southern Louisiana where they lived and recorded the album in 28 days without anyone leaving the house.

Critical reception

Down II was not received as well as the band's debut release, NOLA. Blabbermouth reviewer Borivoj Krgin stated, "Down II appears to have been thrown together more haphazardly, with much of the material falling short of the standard set by Down's classic debut offering." However, UK critics were more enthusiastic, with Metal Hammer awarding the album 8/10 and Rock Sound declaring it "a storming experience from the depths" and rating it at 4/5. Despite its poor US reviews, the album debuted at number 44 on the Billboard 200.

Accolades

Track listing

The song "Ghosts Along the Mississippi" takes its title from a book by photographer Clarence John Laughlin, whose photographs were used extensively in the booklet art for NOLA.
The title "Landing on the Mountains of Meggido" refers to a hill overlooking a valley where the kibbutz of Megiddo, Israel is located. In apocalyptic literature this place is identified as the site of the final battle between the forces of good and evil at the end of time, known as Armageddon. Prior to the album's release the song had originally been titled "Wars".

Personnel
Down
Phil Anselmo – vocals, guitar on "Landing on the Mountains of Meggido"
Pepper Keenan – guitar
Kirk Windstein – guitar
Rex Brown – bass
Jimmy Bower – drums, all instruments on "Doobinterlude"

Additional musicians
Stephanie Opal Weinstein – backing vocals on "Landing on the Mountains of Meggido"

Charts

Tour
To support the album, Down toured on the second stage of Ozzfest in 2002. They also scheduled an 18-date tour that began May 1 in New York and ended on May 25 in Dallas. Afterward, the band once again entered an indefinite hiatus to focus on their respective bands.

References

Down (band) albums
2002 albums
Elektra Records albums
Albums recorded in a home studio